The Esmeraldas Formation is an Early Pliocene (Montehermosan to Chapadmalalan in the SALMA classification) geologic formation of the Borbón Basin in northwestern Ecuador.

Description 
The bioturbated, tuffaceous, green mudstones and sometimes sandstones with small or medium-sized rounded pebbles are scattered throughout the formation, or more rarely concentrated into minor beds or seams of conglomerate. Large calcareous concretions, some rounded or with an irregular rootlike shape, generally with hollow centers are common at many places. The beds are highly foraminiferal, with pelagic types, often pure enough to form a foraminiferal ooze-like sediment. On the fresh surface of the rock platform, the formation is hard, and of a gray-black or dark olive-green color. The sediments were deposited in a deep marine environment.

Fossil content 
The formation has provided bivalve, gastropod, echinoid, coral, bryozoa, radiolaria, foraminifera and scaphopod fossils.

See also 

 List of fossiliferous stratigraphic units in Ecuador

References

Further reading 
 P. F. Hasson and A. G. Fischer. 1986. Observations on the Neogene of Northwestern Ecuador. Micropaleontology 32(1):32-42
 P. Jung. 1989. Revision of the Strombina-group (Gastropoda; Columbellidae), fossil and living. Schweierische Paläontologische Abhandlungen 111:1-298
 A. A. Olsson. 1964. Neogene Mollusks From Northwestern Ecuador

Geologic formations of Ecuador
Pliocene Series of South America
Neogene Ecuador
Chapadmalalan
Montehermosan
Mudstone formations
Sandstone formations
Tuff formations
Deep marine deposits
Formations
Formations